Krystian Mapapalangi (born 4 November 2002) is an Australian professional rugby league footballer who plays as a  and  for the Newcastle Knights in the NRL.

Background
Mapapalangi was born in Burwood, New South Wales. He is of Tongan descent.

Playing career

Early years
Mapapalangi played for the South Sydney Rabbitohs' Harold Matthews Cup team in 2018 and the S. G. Ball Cup side in 2019. In 2020, he joined the Manly Warringah Sea Eagles' S. G. Ball Cup team. Mid-way through 2021, he joined the Newcastle Knights.

2022
Ahead of the 2022 season, Mapapalangi signed a 2-year contract to be a development player with the Knights' NRL squad. In August, his contract was extended until the end of 2024 and upgraded into the top 30 squad. In round 23 of the 2022 NRL season, he made his NRL debut for the Knights against the Canberra Raiders.

References

External links
Newcastle Knights profile

2002 births
Australian rugby league players
Australian people of Tongan descent
Newcastle Knights players
Rugby league centres
Rugby league five-eighths
Rugby league players from Sydney
Living people